Faith is the debut solo studio album by the English singer George Michael, released on 30 October 1987 by Columbia Records and Epic Records. In addition to playing various instruments on the album, Michael wrote and produced every track on the recording except for one, "Look at Your Hands", which he co-wrote with David Austin. A "black" inspired pop-R&B album, Faith's songs include introspective lyrics, which generated controversies about Michael's personal relationships at that time.

Faith peaked at number one on the UK Albums Chart and US Billboard 200. It stayed for 51 non-consecutive weeks inside the Billboard 200 top 10, including 12 weeks at number one. It was also the first album by a white solo artist to hit number one on the Billboard Top Black Albums chart. Faith spawned four number one singles on the Billboard Hot 100: "Faith", "Father Figure", "One More Try", and "Monkey", making Michael the only British male solo artist to have four number one hits from one album on the Billboard Hot 100. Michael embarked on The Faith Tour to promote Faith in February 1988, opening at Tokyo's Budokan arena, before going on to dates in Australia, Europe and North America.

Faith is one of the best-selling albums of all time having sold over 20 million copies worldwide and was certified Diamond by the Recording Industry Association of America in 1996. The album won several awards, including Album of the Year at the 31st Grammy Awards. Michael won three awards at the 1989 American Music Awards: Favorite Pop/Rock Male Artist, Favorite Soul/R&B Male Artist and Favorite Soul/R&B Album. He was also honoured with the MTV Video Vanguard Award. Often ranked as one of the best albums of the 1980s, Faith was ranked number 151 on Rolling Stone's list of the 500 Greatest Albums of All Time in 2020.

Background
By 1986, Michael had spent five years as the lead singer of the popular duo Wham! and had grown tired of accusations that the group, which featured his best friend Andrew Ridgeley, was nothing more than a teenybopper group despite the serious subject matter that was included on albums such as Fantastic and Make It Big. After the success of Make It Big,  Michael had grown weary of continuing the group, and expressed to Ridgeley the desire that they should split up. A decision was made that the group would dissolve following the end of a tenure at Wembley Stadium for what was titled The Final. Following the split, Michael began to work on songs that would eventually  make his first solo album, which would be titled Faith. Michael was inspired by his contemporaries Michael Jackson and Prince: "I absolutely wanted to be in the same stratosphere as [Jackson and Prince], definitely. I’d gone from, a couple of years before, being perfectly happy with being on Top of the Pops, to thinking, 'I can do what Michael Jackson can do.' I mean, he’d just done Thriller for fucks sake! I wouldn’t have the guts now. I wanted to be in that vein but, mostly, I wanted to make music as good as theirs".

Recording
The album took over a year to make. The first songs to be put together for the album were "I Want Your Sex (Part 1)" and "Look At Your Hands" (working title "Betcha Don’t Like It"), recorded in August & September 1986 respectively, at Sarm West Studios in London. However, it wasn't until February 1987—after six months of little activity—that recording had properly started, this time at the PUK Studios facility, located near Aarhus, Denmark. The lack of press activity there proved it to be a comfortable environment for Michael to work in without harassment. Songs were usually written by Michael bit by bit in the studio, often with the aid of technology such as drum machines to help create basic rhythms; he would then develop ideas further from there. Rather than using a live rhythm section (as was the case on Wham!'s Make It Big), each instrument was overdubbed in the main studio. Michael would use session musicians to help realise his musical ideas, otherwise he'd try playing a lot (if not, all) of the parts himself, as was the case on "I Want Your Sex (Part 1)", "Hard Day" and "Monkey". The recording sessions at PUK, however, ended in late May shortly after the recording of the title track, "Faith", owing to Michael beginning to suffer from a bout of cabin fever, according to engineer Chris Porter. Sessions later resumed at Sarm West, where the latter stages of production would take place.

In addition to playing various instruments on the album, he wrote and produced every track on the recording except for one, "Look at Your Hands", which he co-wrote with David Austin. A contemporary "black" pop-R&B album, Faith showcases Michael's vocals in a new style mode. Its songs are littered with introspective lyrics, which generated controversies about Michael's personal relationships at that time. The album comprises many musical styles including soul ("Father Figure", "One More Try"), rock ("Look at Your Hands", "Faith", "Hand to Mouth"), funk ("Monkey", "Hard Day") and jazz ("Kissing a Fool").

Some of the material was more graphic than Michael's previous efforts with Wham! One such song was "I Want Your Sex", which had three parts: the first part was titled "Rhythm 1: Lust", which was the version that would eventually be released as a single and featured electro funk influences; the second part was titled "Rhythm 2: Brass in Love", which mixed a more instrumentally-based funk live instrumentation with a smoother R&B arrangement during the verses; the third part, which was edited to be the final song on the album, was titled "Rhythm 3: A Last Request", featuring a jazz-influenced quiet storm and R&B sound combined with lyrics telling of Michael drunkenly trying to bring his lover to his bed.

The title track began with an organ fanfare that was actually the music to Wham!'s "Freedom" played as if in a cathedral. After this, the song featured a rockabilly sound similar to Bo Diddley while Michael added his own style with his vocals. "Father Figure" originally was a dance-styled production until Michael removed the snare drums from it and kept it that way because he loved what he heard, making the song a mid-tempo R&B ballad. "One More Try" was a soul song in the tradition of songs by Marvin Gaye and Stevie Wonder; its lyrics tell of a man who pushes his lover away out of fear of repeating past relationships, only to accept the invitation in the end.

"Hard Day", much like the first two parts of "I Want Your Sex", was inspired by funk. The social commentary song "Hand to Mouth" had a slight pop and folk approach while a similar social commentary song, "Look at Your Hands", co-written by Michael and David Austin, produced a pop song with rock elements featuring a piano and saxophone. "Monkey" returns to the funk influences of some of the other songs. A remix of the song by Jimmy Jam and Terry Lewis brings a new jack swing approach to the original. "Kissing a Fool" is a jazz-influenced ballad with lyrics solemnly describing a breakup.

The synthesizers used by Michael on the album include the Yamaha DX7, Roland S-50, Roland D-50 and Roland Juno-106 (used for most synthesized bass parts and strings). Drum machines were a LinnDrum (Michael's main drum machine on the album - not the Linn 9000), Roland TR-808 and a Yamaha RX-5, while drum parts were played on a Pearl drum kit ("Look At Your Hands") and Roland Octapad. Engineer Chris Porter's Greengate DS3 sampler was sometimes used in conjunction the Linn for certain drum sounds, although the Linn's sounds were what Michael preferred. Non-synthesized parts were played by Michael on a Fender Precision Bass.

Release

25 weeks after its release, Faith reached number one on the US Billboard 200. Its early, and successive, success on the chart was said to be partly sustained—with help from plenty of press appearances and promotions—by its strong single releases. After "I Want Your Sex" helped propel Faith to its debut atop the chart, the second single "Faith" aided the album's continuing sales dominance. It also reached number one on the UK Albums Chart, although it stayed at the top spot for only one week. Faith stayed for 51 non-consecutive weeks inside the Billboard 200 top 10, including 12 weeks at number one. It was also the first album by a white solo artist to hit number one on the Billboard Top Black Albums chart.

In a 1988 interview with Jet magazine, Michael was quoted as saying: "I was much happier with [Faith] being the No. 1 Black [chart] album than I was when it became the No. 1 Pop album. There was much more of a sense of achievement. I knew this album would be a shock or a surprise to people in this country. The uptempo side of the new music is more overtly sexual, more black."

During 1987 and 1988, Faith produced a string of hit singles for Michael, including six top-five Billboard Hot 100 hits, four of which ("Faith", "Father Figure", "One More Try", and "Monkey") reached number one, making him the only British male solo artist to have four number one hits from one album on the Billboard Hot 100. "Faith" was 1988's best-selling single in the United States; with "Careless Whisper" having been the best-selling single in 1985, Michael became the first musician to achieve two Billboard Year-End number one singles chart since the Beatles' "Hey Jude" topped the Year-End singles chart in 1968 after "I Want to Hold Your Hand" had done so in 1964. Michael also had both the year's number one album and the number one single, which hadn't happened since 1970, when Simon & Garfunkel grabbed both positions with Bridge over Troubled Water and its title track.

A video compilation of the same name was released by CMV Enterprises on August 9, 1988, to promote the album. The singer's first solo video compilation, it contained six music videos from the album—"I Want Your Sex", "Faith", "Father Figure", "One More Try", "Monkey", and "Kissing a Fool". These videos were later released on the 1999 video compilation Ladies & Gentlemen: The Best of George Michael.

The Faith Tour

Michael embarked on a world tour to promote the album in February 1988, opening at Tokyo's Budokan arena, before going on to dates in Australia, Europe and North America. In Los Angeles, Michael was joined on stage by Aretha Franklin for a duet on "I Knew You Were Waiting (For Me)". While on tour, new singles from the album continued to be released. In June, Michael interrupted the tour to sing three songs at Wembley Stadium's Nelson Mandela 70th Birthday Tribute.

Critical reception 

Faith was met with widespread acclaim from music critics. Mark Coleman of Rolling Stone praised Michael for emerging as "one of pop music’s leading artisans, a painstaking craftsman who combines a graceful knack for vocal hooks with an uncanny ability to ransack the past for musical ideas and still sound fresh" and dubbed Michael the "Elton John of the 1980s". Coleman also claimed that Faith is "a concept album of sorts" incorporating "disco groove [varying] from urban thump to slow tropical heat wave", praising it for being "grounded in a passion and personal commitment".

Faith earned Michael numerous accolades, including Album of the Year at the 31st Grammy Awards. Michael was awarded three awards at the 1989 American Music Awards: Favorite Pop/Rock Male Artist, Favorite Soul/R&B Male Artist and Favorite Soul/R&B Album for Faith. He was also honoured with the MTV Video Vanguard Award. Faith was the best-selling album of 1988 in the United States, and eventually reached Diamond certification by the Recording Industry Association of America. According to Nielsen SoundScan, current sales of the album stand at 11 million copies, making it the 52nd bestselling album in the United States. Faith has sold around over 20 million copies worldwide.

Reappraisal 
In a Billboard review, Faith was considered to have "cemented [Michael] as an MTV icon and a global superstar" and shaping the sound of "late-'80s pop as much as any LP of its time." Writing for BBC Music, Ian Wade praised Faith for being a "classic of its era" and "one of the more listenable major releases of the 80s." He also regarded the album being responsible for turning Michael into a "proper international superstar, confirming his rightful place at pop's top table."

Reviewing the reissue of Faith for the Metro in 2011, Arwa Haider claimed: "Faith still bursts with self-belief, designer vanity, classic songs and imagery, right from the opening title track which begins with a funeral church organ rendition of Wham!'s hit, "Freedom", before clicking into jaunty rock 'n' roll. It's easy to hear why Faith achieved multi-million status, although the masterful ballads ("Father Figure", "One More Try") have stood the test of time better than Michael's funk-pop." Following the 30th anniversary of the release of the single "Faith", Nate Hertweck wrote in a Grammy Awards review that the song "change[d] everything".

In 1989, Faith was ranked at number 84 on Rolling Stones list of the Greatest Albums of the 80s. In 2003, the album was ranked at number 480 on Rolling Stones list of the 500 Greatest Albums of All Time, while in 2012, the album ranked eight places higher at number 472 on an updated list by the magazine. In a 2020 revised list, it moved up to 151. Faith was ranked 79th in a 2005 survey held by British television's Channel 4 to determine the 100 Greatest Albums of All Time. In 2006, Q magazine placed the album at number 24 in its list of 40 Best Albums of the '80s. Slant Magazine listed the album at number 62 on its list of Best Albums of the 1980s.

2011 remastered release 

The 2011 re-release received universal acclaim from music critics according to Metacritic. A remastered edition of Faith was released on 31 January 2011 in the UK and on 1 February 2011 in the US. It is available in several formats: Limited Edition Collectors Box Set, Two-CD and DVD Special Edition, Two-CD Edition and iTunes LP. The box set release features: the remastered album on CD, an additional CD of remastered 12" versions and B-sides; a DVD featuring a TV special from 1987, a hardbound book that includes an exclusive interview with George Michael, sleeve notes, rare photos and memorabilia; a vinyl album replica of the original LP; and a memorabilia envelope that includes five art prints, reproduction poster, tickets and tour pass from the Faith tour sourced from Michael's personal archive. All this is housed in a 12 x 12 numbered, black and gold-foiled slipcase with original artwork overlay. The first 2,000 copies were also provided with a hand-numbered lithograph attached (taped) outside the box set.

Accolades

Billboard Year-End Number One Awards

|-
| 1988 || Faith || Top Pop Albums ||

Grammy Awards

|-
|  style="width:35px; text-align:center;" rowspan="2"|1989 || Faith(performed and produced by George Michael) || Album of the Year || 
|-
| "Father Figure"(performed by George Michael) ||Best Pop Vocal Performance – Male|| 
|-

American Music Awards

|-
|  style="width:35px; text-align:center;" rowspan="4"|1989 || rowspan="2"| Faith || Favorite Soul/R&B Album || 
|-
| Favorite Pop/Rock Album || 
|-
| rowspan="2"| George Michael || Favorite Soul/R&B Male Artist || 
|-
| Favorite Pop/Rock Male Artist || 
|-

MTV Video Music Awards

|-
|  style="width:35px; text-align:center;" rowspan="3"|1988 || "Father Figure"(Directors: Andy Morahan and George Michael) || Best Direction in a Video || 
|-
| "Father Figure" (Director of Photography: Peter Mackay) || Best Cinematography in a Video || 
|-
| "Faith" (Art Director: Bryan Jones) || Best Art Direction in a Video || 
|-
|  style="width:35px; text-align:center;"|1989 || George Michael || Video Vanguard Award || 
|-

Brit Awards

|-
|  style="width:35px; text-align:center;" rowspan="2"|1988 || Faith || Best British Album || 
|-
| George Michael || Best British Male Artist || 
|-

Ivor Novello Awards

|-
|  style="width:35px; text-align:center;"|1989 || Faith || International Hit of the Year || 
|-

Japan Gold Disc Awards

|-
|  style="width:35px; text-align:center;"| 1988 || Faith || The Best International Pop Solo Album of the Year || 
|-

Track listing
All tracks are written and produced by George Michael; "Look at Your Hands" co-written by David Austin.
Standard edition

Note
In the liner notes, "I Want Your Sex" is listed as "I Want Your Sex (Monogamy Mix)", with the parts titled "Rhythm One: Lust" and "Rhythm Two: Brass in Love", respectively. However, on the album, the start of "Rhythm One" is slightly different from how the corresponding section starts on the actual "Monogamy Mix" as featured on the previous single release: on the album, the song starts with a synthesized bass and electronic effects, while the drums and programmed percussion come in some seconds later; on the single, the song starts only with drums and percussion.

VHS video compilation
 "I Want Your Sex" (Uncensored version) – music video
 "Faith" – music video
 "Father Figure" – music video
 "One More Try" – music video
 "Monkey" – music video
 "Kissing A Fool" – music video

2011 remaster
Disc one

Track 1–9 of the first disc features the remastered version of the original album.
"A Last Request (I Want Your Sex Part 3)" – 3:48

Disc two
"Faith"  – 3:16
"Fantasy" – 5:02
"Hard Day"  – 9:04
"I Believe (When I Fall in Love It Will Be Forever)" (Stevie Wonder, Yvonne Wright)  – 7:03
"Kissing a Fool"  – 4:35
"Love's in Need of Love Today"  (Wonder) – 4:43
"Monkey"  – 4:48
"Monkey"  – 7:27
"Monkey"  – 8:10

Note
"I Believe When I Fall in Love" is a live track although it's not mentioned anywhere on the CD.

2011 remaster DVD
 George Michael and Jonathan Ross Have Words (1987)
 Music Money Love Faith (February 1988)
 "I Want Your Sex" – music video (re-synched with re-mastered audio)
 "I Want Your Sex" (Uncensored version) – music video
 "Faith" – music video
 "Father Figure" – music video
 "One More Try" – music video
 "Monkey" – music video
 "Kissing a Fool" – music video

Personnel
George Michael – vocals, keyboards (2, 3, 5, 6, 8), bass guitar (6), keyboard bass (9), drums (7), programming, percussion, arranger, producer
Robert Ahwai – guitar
J.J. Belle – guitar
Hugh Burns – guitar
Roddy Matthews – guitar on "Monkey"
Chris Cameron – piano, keyboards, organ, backing vocals
Betsy Cook – keyboards
Danny Schogger – keyboards
Deon Estus – bass guitar
Ian Thomas – drums
Andy Duncan – percussion
Rick Taylor – trombone
Steve Sidwell – trumpet
Malcolm Griffiths – trombone
Jamie Talbot – saxophone
Paul Spong – trumpet
 John Altman – saxophone

Mark Chandler – trumpet
Steve Waterman – trumpet
Shirley Lewis – backing vocals
Technical
Chris Porter – engineer
Paul Gomersall – assistant engineer
Paul Wright – assistant engineer
Shep Pettibone – remix, additional production
Steve Peck – remix engineer

Charts

Weekly charts

Decade-end charts

Year-end charts

All-time charts

Certifications and sales

See also

List of best-selling albums
List of best-selling albums in the United States
List of Billboard Hot 100 number-one singles of 1988
List of Billboard number-one R&B albums of 1988

References

1987 debut albums
Columbia Records albums
Epic Records albums
George Michael albums
Grammy Award for Album of the Year